The Municipality of Huron East is a Canadian municipality located in Huron County, Ontario. It was formed in 2001 as an amalgamation of the former Grey, McKillop and Tuckersmith townships with the town of Seaforth and village of Brussels, due to an Ontario-wide local government restructuring imposed by the government of that time. The municipality is structured as five wards based on the former townships, town and village.

Geography
Huron East includes or borders on the following communities:
 Brucefield (borders with the Municipality of Bluewater)
 Brussels (borders with the Municipality of Morris-Turnberry)
 Cranbrook
 Egmondville
 Ethel
 Harpurhey
 Hensall (former village of Hensall is now under the Municipality of Bluewater)
 Kippen (borders with the Municipality of Bluewater)
 Leadbury
 Molesworth (borders with Perth County)
 Seaforth
 Vanastra (borders with the Municipality of Central Huron)
 Walton (borders on the Municipality of Morris-Turnberry)
 Winthrop
 St. Columban (borders with Perth County,  half of St. Columban is in Huron County, the other half is in Perth County)

Demographics

See also
List of townships in Ontario

References

External links

Lower-tier municipalities in Ontario
Municipalities in Huron County, Ontario